Qunaba is a rural locality in the Bundaberg Region, Queensland, Australia. In the  Qunaba had a population of 793 people.

Geography 
Qunaba is predominantly farming land, much of it used to grow sugarcane. It is mostly flat land with the exception of the Sloping Hummock, commonly known as the Bundaberg Hummock or simply the Hummock which provides excellent views over the surrounding flat farmlands. The sides of the Hummock have attracted residential development to take advantage of the views.

History 

Qunaba takes its name from the Qunaba sugar plantation and mill. Originally established as the Mon Repos plantation and mill, it was taken over in 1900 by the Queensland National Bank who renamed it Qunaba (coined from QUeensland NAtional BAnk).

In 1930, the Bundaberg branch of the Royal Automobile Club of Queensland (RACQ) acquired the land at the top of the Hummock in order to create a park for motoring tourists to enjoy the views. The park was officially opened on 17 October 1931.

On 14 August 1937, the President of the RACQ unveiled a memorial to the Bundaberg-born aviator Bert Hinkler on the top of the Hummock.

In the 2011 census, Qunaba had a population of 822 people.

In the  Qunaba had a population of 793 people.

Heritage listings 
Qunaba has the following heritage listings:
 Sir Anthony's Rest Street: Sir Anthony's Rest, a dry-stone rubble platform, constructed during the visit of the Governor of Queensland, Sir Anthony Musgrave, to Bundaberg in 1888

Education
There are no schools in Qunanba. The nearest primary schools are Bargara State School in neighbouring Mon Repos to the north-east, Kalkie State School in Kalkie to the south-west, and Burnett Heads State School in neighbouring Burnett Heads to the north. The nearest secondary school is Kepnock State High School in Kepnock to the south-west.

Amenities
There are a number of parks in the locality, including:

 Heathwood Park
 Hilltop Drive Road Park

 Turners Way Park

Attractions
The Hummock Lookout is on Turners Way.

See also
 List of tramways in Queensland

References

External links

Bundaberg Region
Localities in Queensland